Richard Lesley Voorhees (born June 5, 1941) is a senior United States district judge of the United States District Court for the Western District of North Carolina.

Education and career

Born in Syracuse, New York, Voorhees was in the United States Army as an ROTC Cadet from 1959 to 1963. He received a Bachelor of Arts degree from Davidson College in 1963 and a Juris Doctor from the University of North Carolina School of Law in 1968. He was in the United States Army Signal Corps as a Lieutenant from 1963 to 1965. He was an Army Reserves Captain from 1965 to 1969, and was in private practice in Gastonia, North Carolina from 1968 to 1988.

Federal judicial service

On July 31, 1987, Voorhees was nominated by President Ronald Reagan to a seat on the United States District Court for the Western District of North Carolina vacated by Judge David B. Sentelle. He was confirmed by the United States Senate on October 14, 1988, and received his commission on October 17, 1988. He served as Chief Judge from 1991 to 1998. He assumed senior status on August 31, 2017.

References

Sources
 

1941 births
Living people
Davidson College alumni
Judges of the United States District Court for the Western District of North Carolina
Lawyers from Syracuse, New York
United States district court judges appointed by Ronald Reagan
20th-century American judges
United States Army officers
University of North Carolina School of Law alumni
21st-century American judges